This is a list of rivers of Montserrat. Rivers are listed in clockwise order, starting at the north end of the island.

Farm River 
Lee River
Paradise River (formerly a tributary of the Farm river, course altered by pyroclastic flows)
Tar River Valley (destroyed by pyroclastic flows)
Hot River
White River (destroyed by pyroclastic flows)
Belham River a corruption of Balham, a plantation on the south of the river, previously The River estate. Known as Old Road River until at least 1900 
Dyer’s River
Nantes River  known as Norris River until at least 1930
Collins River

References
GEOnet Names Server
Map of Pyroclastic Flows in Montserrat
Ordnance Survey 1962 (pre-eruption)

Montserrat
Rivers of Montserrat